Lyria boucheti is a species of sea snail, a marine gastropod mollusk in the family Volutidae, the volutes.

Description
The length of the shell attains 73.4 mm.

Distribution
This marine species occurs off the Fiji Islands.

References

 Bail & Poppe. 2004. A conchological iconography. The tribe Lyriini. In ConchBooks : 1–93.

Volutidae
Gastropods described in 2004